BSD City, formerly referred to Bumi Serpong Damai is a planned community located within Greater Jakarta in Indonesia. The project was initiated in 1984 by a group of private developers and started in 1989. The town is currently managed by the holding company PT Bumi Serpong Damai Tbk, which is owned by Sinar Mas Land, a subsidiary of the Sinar Mas Group, a large industrial conglomerate in Indonesia. BSD City encompasses a total area of approximately 6,000 hectares, hosting a range of residential houses, apartments, malls, offices, and more. Most of the residential areas are designed to be suitable for Indonesia's upper-middle class, in gated neighbourhoods, each with different themes.  The city is now a self-sustaining community, with businesses, schools, shopping malls, hospitals and hotels.

History
In the 1980s, the Serpong district of South Tangerang was a largely uninhabited rubber plantation. At the time, infrastructure such as asphalted roads and electricity was yet to be built. In 1984, Ir. Ciputra planned to build an independent township in the district, to be named as Bumi Serpong Damai. The development of the township was backed by 11 private companies including Pembangunan Jaya, Sinar Mas, Salim Group, and Metropolitan Kentjana with a total of Rp 3.2 trillion investment. The inauguration was held on 16 January 1989, attended by the Minister of Home Affairs at the time, Rudini. At the time of project development during the 1990s, BSD City was the most ambitious urban planning scheme in Indonesia to combine housing, business and commercial properties. It is designed to be a self-sustaining community, with various types of public facilities available to its residents. The township started growing, and as the Jakarta–Tangerang Toll Road opened, residents started coming in as it provides an easier access to the township.

During the 1997 Asian financial crisis, real estate business in Indonesia stagnated for around 5 years. Due to this, Bumi Serpong Damai changed ownership to Sinar Mas Land around 2003–2004. To change its brand image, Sinar Mas eventually changed the name of the township into its initials, becoming BSD City, and built new residential clusters with new names (De Latinos, The Icon, Sevilla, Foresta, etc.) to market it better. Sinar Mas continues to develop the township, expanding from the Serpong district into the Tangerang Regency, in which they plan to build the next phase of BSD City.

Facilities
Construction of a Smart Digital City is currently still going on, first phase of which is expected to be completed by 2019.Sinar Mas Group has formed a joint-venture with a Japanese consortium led by automotive conglomerate Mitsubishi Corporation to develop a mixed-use area in BSD City, with an investment of more than $260 million.

Educational institutions

Schools
There are currently 127 formal schools located in BSD City. Aside from public schools, the township is also home to multiple national and international schools.
Al-Azhar BSD
BINUS Serpong Cambridge International School
German School Jakarta
IPEKA BSD Christian School
Jakarta Nanyang School
Saint John's Catholic School
Santa Ursula BSD
Sinarmas World Academy
Stella Maris School
Syafana Islamic School

Universities
Many universities have opened their secondary campus in BSD City due to its prime location and abundance of land. The township is currently home to 9 universities, with plans of more development in the future. BINUS University is setting up to build another campus in the Digital Hub district of BSD City.
Atma Jaya Catholic University BSD Campus
International University Liaison Indonesia
Institut Teknologi Indonesia
Monash University
Prasetiya Mulya University

Shopping and retail

Shopping malls
The township bolsters a number of shopping malls, from Composite Shop such as ITC BSD to upscale malls like AEON Mall BSD.
AEON Mall BSD
BSD Junction
BSD Plaza
ITC BSD
TerasKota

Retail precincts
There are also retail precincts and shophouses, along with modern markets located throughout the township. The Breeze in particular is developed as a lifestyle and entertainment center, with an open-air design to allow walkability, and supporting a motto "Mall Without Walls".
The Breeze
Pasar Modern BSD
Pasar Modern Intermoda BSD
QBIG

Healthcare
Various healthcare facilities can be found in BSD City, including hospitals, clinics, pharmacies, outpatient care centers, and specialized care centers, such as birthing centers and psychiatric care centers. Eka Hospital is the leading hospital in the township, harboring 65 outpatient clinics and 200 beds. Medika Hospital is also nearby, along with government-mandated health clinics such as Puskesmas.

Accommodation
There are budget and high-end hotels in the township. Apartments and sharehouses are also available to rent for short-term residents, such as university students as well as foreign workers.
Grand Zuri Hotel
Mercure Hotel
POP! Hotel
Pranaya Boutique Hotel
Santika Premier ICE BSD City
Santika TerasKota
Sapphire Sky Hotel & Convention
The Grantage Hotel & Sky Lounge

Places of interest
Taman Kota 1 – Public park with a jogging track and exercise equipment.
Taman Kota 2 – Public park with woodland walks and a playground.
Taman Kota 3 – City park with sitting areas and a roller-skating rink.
Ocean Park – Amusement park with water slides, wave pool, and food courts.
Damai Indah Golf – Golf centre with two courses, a swimming pool, and a cafeteria.
Edutown Arena – Multipurpose arena used for events and competitions.
Indonesia Convention Exhibition (ICE) – Biggest convention center in Indonesia.
BSD City Grand Prix – Street circuit used for local motorsport events. This street circuit serves as a spiritual successor to the now-defunct Lippo Village International Formula Circuit in Lippo Village.

Transportation

Toll roads
BSD City is surrounded by several toll roads connecting the township to Jakarta and other satellite cities. The Jakarta–Serpong Toll Road, connecting Ulujami to Serpong, runs through the southern end of BSD City. There are two exits currently present, one to Jl. Letnan Sutopo and another to Jl. Kapten Soebijanto Djojohadikusumo. The planned extension of the toll road, Serpong–Balaraja Toll Road will also cross West BSD and link the city to Balaraja in Tangerang Regency and is set to open in June 2022. The Kunciran–Serpong Toll Road, part of the Jakarta Outer Ring Road 2, also links the township to Tangerang, Depok and other metropolitan areas in Greater Jakarta.

Public transport
Serpong, Rawa Buntu, and Cisauk railway stations of KRL Commuterline is situated within and nearby the development. TransJakarta has a feeder route from BSD City to Jelambar in West Jakarta. There are free shuttle and school bus services within the development. There are also shuttle bus services that provides services to MRT's Fatmawati station.

BSD City Intermoda district connects transportation from within and outside the township through KRL Commuterline, and transportation within the BSD City itself with the free shuttle bus BSD Link that connects several important locations in BSD City.

Buses such as Mayasari Bakti and angkot (share taxi) is also an option, with routes connecting the township to other nearby districts:
Angkot B04 BSD City–Cikokol–Poris Plawad
Angkot B07 Serpong–Cikokol–Kalideres (via BSD City)
Angkot R03A Serpong–Cikokol–Poris Plawad (via BSD City)
Angkot C11 BSD City–Ciledug
Angkot D08 BSD City–Ciputat (via Kampung Sawah – Jombang)
Angkot D12A BSD City–Ciputat (via Serua – Bukit – Ciater)
Mayasari Bakti AC74A Patas to Kampung Rambutan (via Karawaci – BSD City – JORR – Ps. Rebo)
Mayasari Bakti AC117 Patas to Pulo Gadung (via Cikokol – Kebon Nanas – BSD City – Tol JORR – Ps. Rebo – UKI – Bypass - Pemuda)

See also

Tangerang Regency
South Tangerang
Greater Jakarta
Sinar Mas Land
Indonesia Convention Exhibition

References 

South Tangerang
Sinar Mas Group
Post-independence architecture of Indonesia
Planned townships in Indonesia